Klara Grön (lived end of the 18th and beginning of the 19th centuries) was a Finnish prostitute who, despite this and despite having children outside of marriage, married a Russian officer; this was rare for her time and place. She lived in Ruotsinsalmi sea fortress.

References

19th-century Finnish women
Finnish prostitutes